Botafogo FC may refer to:
 Botafogo de Futebol e Regatas, Brazilian football club
Botafogo FC (Douala), Cameroonian football club